Her Final Flight is a Big Finish Productions audio drama based on the long-running British science fiction television series Doctor Who. It was initially made available as an exclusive bonus to Big Finish series subscribers and was not sold commercially, although it is now available to nonsubscribers.

Plot
The Sixth Doctor lands on the planet Refiloe, where it seems the TARDIS has taken her final flight, and is amazed to encounter his former companion, Peri.

Cast
The Doctor — Colin Baker
Peri — Nicola Bryant
The Agent — Steven Bugdale
Hamiyun — Jonathan Owen
Rashaa — Heather Tracy
Damus — Conrad Westmaas

Notes
This was originally a special release given away to Big Finish subscribers who had The Next Life as part of their subscription, but is now available for purchase.
 The story was originally scheduled to feature the Seventh Doctor and Mel (a CD cover featuring the Seventh Doctor was created by Stuart Manning during pre-production).
 The incidental music includes a recording of The Saint James' Singers, conducted by Julian Harris  with music composed by Julian Shortman .

External links
Big Finish Productions – Her Final Flight

Sixth Doctor audio plays